Galdene  is a mountain in the municipality of Hol in Buskerud, Norway.

References

Hol
Mountains of Viken